Tasmin Archer (born 3 August 1963) is a British pop singer from Bradford, England. Her first album, Great Expectations, spawned the hit "Sleeping Satellite", which reached number one in the United Kingdom and Ireland. She won the Brit Award for British Breakthrough Act in 1993 and has since released three more studio albums.

Early life
Archer was born in Bradford, Yorkshire. She attended Grange Upper School and, after leaving, first worked as a sewing machine operator. She attended Bradford College in 1980 to study typing, and then became a clerk at Leeds Magistrates' Court.

Archer joined a group called Dignity as a backing vocalist, and played with different bands around the Bradford area. She helped out at a recording studio in Bradford called Flexible Response Studios, and subsequently began working with musicians John Hughes and John Beck as "The Archers". During this time, Archer developed skills in the music business.

Musical career

Great Expectations
Archer signed to EMI in 1990, and released her first single, "Sleeping Satellite" in September 1992, which went to number one on the UK Singles Chart. The single also enjoyed success in the US, where it peaked at number 32 on the Billboard Hot 100. The album Great Expectations followed in October 1992. It reached number eight on the UK Albums Chart, and achieved gold disc status by December for sales of more than 100,000 copies. Further singles from the album followed, and although they were Top 40 hits in the UK, they did not achieve the same level of success as her début.

Archer donated the royalties from her second single "In Your Care" to Childline. The song was about child abuse. In 1993 Archer won a BRIT Award for the Best British Breakthrough Act. She later joked that she kept her award in the back of her kitchen cupboard, and claimed that she used it for cracking nuts and tenderising steak.

Bloom
After disappearing from the limelight, Archer reappeared in 1996 with her second album Bloom. However, the single "One More Good Night with the Boys" failed to reach the UK Top 40, and the album peaked at number 95. In late 1997, disagreements with EMI left Archer somewhat disillusioned and feeling like she had been treated as a commodity. She decided to take a short break from the industry, after being let go by EMI. This break lasted two years.

After the break, Archer felt the time was right to start writing again, but now she was hindered by writer's block. Although this did not prevent her from being initially creative, she found it difficult to finish anything musically.

On
After working through the block and starting in 2002, Archer and Hughes worked on a new album. Initially this was going to be titled Non-Linear, but later became On. Several demo versions of the songs from this album were available for free from the messagetothemagnet website, which was created for the purpose. People were encouraged to send feedback on the material.

On was released on 25 September 2006 on Archer's own label, Quiverdisc. It was preceded on 20 September by a download-only single, "Every Time I Want It (Effect Is Monotony)", a radio edit of the album track "Effect Is Monotony".

Other work
In a 2006 interview, Archer said she and John Hughes were pursuing opportunities to write for film and TV soundtracks. Subsequently, the partners provided work for EastEnders and other shows.

Awards and nominations
{| class=wikitable
|-
! Year !! Awards !! Work !! Category !! Result !! Ref.
|-
| rowspan=4|1993
| rowspan=3|Brit Awards
| rowspan=2|Herself
| British Breakthrough Act
| 
| rowspan=3|
|-
| British Female Solo Artist
| 
|-
| "Sleeping Satellite"
| British Video of the Year
| 
|-
| RSH Gold Awards
| Herself
| Power Groove of the Year
| 
|

Discography

Studio albums

Compilations
 Premium Gold Collection (2000)
 Singer/Songwriter (2004)
 The Best Of (2009)
 Sweet Little Truths: The EMI Recordings 1992–1996 (2020) – 3-CD set containing remastered, expanded versions of Great Expectations and Bloom plus B-sides, remixes and live versions.

Singles

References

External links
 
 

1963 births
English songwriters
Brit Award winners
20th-century Black British women singers
Musicians from Bradford
Living people
English women pop singers
21st-century Black British women singers
SBK Records artists